The fiery-necked nightjar (Caprimulgus pectoralis) is a species of nightjar in the family Caprimulgidae, which occurs in Africa south of the equator. Its distinctive and frequently uttered call is rendered as 'good-lord-deliver-us'. It is replaced in the tropics by a near relative, the black-shouldered nightjar, which Clements considers a subspecies. In addition to the latter, it forms a species complex with the Montane and Ruwenzori nightjars.

Range
It ranges from coastal Kenya southwards to the southern regions of Tanzania, the D.R.C. and Angola, to Malawi, Mozambique, Botswana, Namibia, South Africa, Eswatini, Zambia, and Zimbabwe.

Description
The plumage of this small species of nightjar is fairly colourful with marked contrasts. The center of the crown is marked with swarthy stripes, the ear coverts are chestnut brown, and the necked is fringed and highlighted with tawny shades. The gape is fringed with rictal bristles with white bases. The grey scapulars are marked with two clear rows of angular black spots. White markings cover the outer vanes of the primary feather emargination, and in males, the outer tail feather is marked with an extended white outer vane. The wing coverts are marked with small, pearly spots.

Races
There are four to five accepted races:
 C. p. subsp. pectoralis – southern South Africa
Description: Largest race with darkest plumage
 C. p. subsp. fervidus – southern African woodlands
 C. p. subsp. shelleyi – central African woodlands
 C. p. subsp. crepusculans – eastern lowlands and lowveld
 C. (p.) nigriscapularis – a northern race or full species

References

External links
 Image at ADW 
 Fiery-necked nightjar - Species text in The Atlas of Southern African Birds.

fiery-necked nightjar
Birds of Sub-Saharan Africa
fiery-necked nightjar
fiery-necked nightjar
Taxonomy articles created by Polbot